The phrase Jaws of Life refers to various hydraulic rescue tools.

Jaws of Life or variants may also refer to:

 The Jaws of Life, 1984 album by Hunters & Collectors
 The Jaws of Life, 2023 album by Pierce the Veil
 Iron jaw (circus), circus act also called "Jaws of Life"